Adlen Griche (born 3 March 1979) is an Algerian former footballer.

Career
On 21 June 2009 Griche signed a contract with Shabab Al-Ordon Al-Qadisiya.

Honours
 Finalist of the Algerian Cup once with USM El Harrach in 2011

References

External links
 
 

1979 births
Living people
Algerian footballers
Algerian expatriate footballers
Expatriate footballers in Jordan
CS Constantine players
MO Constantine players
USM El Harrach players
Algerian Ligue Professionnelle 1 players
Association football defenders
21st-century Algerian people